Following is a list of notable architects from Latvia.

A–K

 Oskars Bārs (1848-1914)
 Jānis Fridrihs Baumanis (1834-1891)
 Gunārs Birkerts (1925-2017)
 Vilhelms Bokslafs (1858-1945)
 Otto Dietze (1833-1890)
 Pāvils Dreijmanis (1895-1953)
 Mihails Eizenšteins (1867-1920)
 Johann Felsko (1813-1902)
 Karl Felsko (1844-1918)
 Aleksandrs Klinklāvs (1899-1982)

L–Z

 Eižens Laube (1880-1967)
 Konstantīns Pēkšēns (1859-1928)
 Ernests Štālbergs (1883-1958)
 Edgars Zalāns (born 1967)
 Verners Vitands (1903-1982)
 Edmund von Trompowsky (1851-1919)

See also

 List of architects
 List of Latvian sculptors
 List of Latvians
 Culture of Latvia

References 

 

Latvian
Architects